Aganampudi is a suburb of the city of Visakhapatnam state of Andhra Pradesh, India.

About
Aganampudi is one of the important suburbs in Visakhapatnam  with many industries and engineering colleges situated there. Gajuwaka RTO office is located in this area. This area sits adjacent to the township of Visakhapatnam steel plant.

Transport
It is well connected with Gajuwaka, NAD X Road, Malkapuram, Dwaraka Nagar and Visakhapatnam Steel Plant. Many local people here are working in steel plants.
Nearest Railway station is Duvvada which is 4 km from here.
NH 16 (chennai-kolkata Highway) passes through this village.

APSRTC routes

References

Neighbourhoods in Visakhapatnam